Crotone is a genus of fungi in the family Venturiaceae.

References

External links

Venturiaceae
Dothideomycetes genera